Active Robots is a British company which sells robotics kits, components, accessories and parts.

History
Active Robots was founded in 2002 and incorporated in 2003 by Antony Lovedale and his wife, Maggie. The company has over 3000 product lines.

Active Robots acquired Total Robots in 2009.

In 2013, the company created Active8 Robots, which provides robotic research technology to universities in the United Kingdom and Europe with the Baxter research robot and Nao humanoid robot.

Educational outreach

Primary and secondary
Active Robots has been involved in education in the United Kingdom for over 10 years. They have coordinated with education providers such as EDT to promote STEM enrichment. Events such as "Lego Robot Wars" and "Robot Gladiators" have been held in partnership with local educators. Active Robots has been called the best provider of robotics in education by the blog Total Education. Part of their outreach work has focused on primary school children, particularly girls, introducing them to robotics and engineering at a young age. Over 200 schools worldwide are using the Nao robot.

Higher education
The Baxter robot is being used in university research and teaching in the UK. At least 15 universities in the UK have used the Baxter robot.

Press
Active Robots products have appeared on The Graham Norton Show, Gadget Man, The Gadget Show and ITV's Daybreak.

See also
Robotics
Educational robotics

References

Robotics companies of the United Kingdom